Kongigan (also Romanized as Kongīgān) is a village in Gohreh Rural District, Fin District, Bandar Abbas County, Hormozgan Province, Iran. At the 2006 census, its population was 29, in 5 families.

References 

Populated places in Bandar Abbas County